Damjan Krstevski, Дамјан Крстевски (born June 30, 1999) is a Macedonian professional basketball Shooting guard, who currently plays for Vardar in the Macedonian First League.

Professional career 
He started his career in Rabotnički. On his debut for the club, he achieved 9 points, 2 assists and 2 rebounds in an 85–103 win over the Shkupi.

Junior ABA League 
On November 24, 2017, he was loaned to MZT Skopje U19 for the semi-final tournament in Belgrade. He made his debut for the MZT Skopje in their season opener scoring 27 points, seven rebounds, one assist and five steals in an 86–82 win over the Mornar Bar U19.

References

External links
 Eurobasket Profile
 ABA League Profile
 FIBA Profile

1999 births
Guards (basketball)
Sportspeople from Skopje
Macedonian men's basketball players
Living people
KK Rabotnički players